Giselle Clarkson is a New Zealand cartoonist and illustrator, best known for her non-fiction comics on conservation and environmental issues.

Life 
Clarkson studied for Bachelor of Fine Arts at the University of Canterbury, intending to become a painter but majoring in photography. She works as a freelance illustrator and comics artist, and lives in Wellington.

After graduation she worked in an outdoor equipment shop and volunteered with conservation projects; she was torn between becoming an artist and working for the Department of Conservation. Her entry into illustration was a 2013 poster depicting New Zealand fishes. Later illustrations of New Zealand native birds, distributed through Twitter, led to commissions from Forest and Bird's children's magazine, the New Zealand School Journal, newspapers, websites, and magazines, and a career in illustration.

Work 
Clarkson's first published comic, "The Flood", appeared in the 2016 collection of Aotearoa women's comics Three Words. Her best known work, "Biscuits and Slices of New Zealand", is a visual catalogue of New Zealand baking, with each object given a fanciful Latin name: for example, Anzac biscuit is "Lestwee forgetum". Widely shared in social media, this was published in Annual 2 and subsequently became a poster and tea towel; Clarkson was interviewed about the success of the comic on TV3's The Project.

Clarkson has a monthly comic in New Zealand children's literature website The Sapling, on children's books and how they influenced her as an illustrator. She frequently undertakes field expeditions as part of her work to places such as the Kermadecs, Milford Sound (to draw penguins) or the Subantarctic Islands (a 19-day sea voyage which led to an 8-page comic in the School Journal). She created T-shirts for the Radio New Zealand show Critter of the Week. In 2018 she produced a comics summary of a scientific paper on the migration of the Fiordland penguin or tawaki (Eudyptes pachyrhynchus), which was enthusiastically retweeted by Diana Gabaldon. She has also illustrated a number of children's books published by Gecko Press.

Publications 

 "The Flood." (2016.) in: Joyce, Rae, Sarah Laing, and Indira Neville (eds.) Three Words. Beatnik. 
"A Box of Birds." (2016.) in: de Goldi, Kate, and Susan Paris (eds.) Annual. Gecko Press. 
 "New Zealand Biscuits and Slices" (2017.) in: de Goldi, Kate, and Susan Paris (eds.) Annual 2. Gecko Press. 
"The Subantarctic Islands". School Journal (3 August 2017)
"Tawaki, Marathon Penguins" (2018.)
Meredith, Courtney Sina. (2018.) Secret World of Butterflies. Allen & Unwin: Auckland.  (Illustrator)
Blanchard, Nan. (2019.) Hazel and the Snails. Annual Ink.  (Illustrator)
Cowley, Joy. (2019.) The Gobbledegook Book - A Joy Cowley Anthology. Gecko Press.  (Illustrator)
Tylee, Alexandra. (2020.) Egg and Spoon - An Illustrated Cookbook. Gecko Press.  (Illustrator)
Cowley, Joy. (2021.) The Tiny Woman's Coat. Gecko Press.  (Illustrator)

References

External links 

Giselle Clarkson Illustration (website)
Giselle Clarkson comics in The Sapling

New Zealand cartoonists
New Zealand women cartoonists
New Zealand comics artists
New Zealand female comics artists
Year of birth missing (living people)
University of Canterbury alumni
Living people
New Zealand illustrators
New Zealand women illustrators
New Zealand children's book illustrators